Thomas Erat Harrison (1858–1917) was an English artist who made sculptures, medals, paintings, and stained glass.

Biography 

Harrison was born in St John's Wood, London; his father was a builder. He was active between 1885 and 1910. He exhibited at the Arts and Crafts Exhibition Society, at the Annual Autumn Exhibition of Modern Pictures in Oil and Water Colour, and Architectural Designs at Nottingham Castle Museum, and at the Art Workers Guild. Among his works are streetscapes and portraits.

He contributed a painting to an 1882 book Bedford Park, celebrating the then-fashionable garden suburb of that name.

He made stained glass for churches such as the Church of St John the Baptist, Newport.
He made a set of 12 stained glass windows for Betteshanger House in Kent, based on Edmund Spenser's The Faerie Queene; the windows depict the months of the year with their signs of the zodiac.

References

1858 births
1917 deaths
19th-century English artists
20th-century English artists